Walla Walla General Hospital was a 72-bed acute-care hospital located at the base of the Blue Mountains and served approximately 70,000 residents of Southeastern Washington and Northeastern Oregon. It closed in July 2017.

History
In 1899, Isaac and Maggie Dunlap returned to the Walla Walla Valley after completing studies at the Battle Creek Sanitarium located in Michigan. They opened treatment rooms in the basement of the administration building at Walla Walla College. During the first year, some 3,000 patients were treated. In 1903, they built a structure that doubled as their home and a sanitarium and in 1906, they purchased the old College Place public schoolhouse. This structure was moved to the Walla Walla College campus, hoisted up and a new first floor was built underneath it. It was dedicated on June 3, 1907.

The first female physician, Dr. Runck, joined staff in 1910 and within the next few years extensive improvements were made to the "department devoted to women's medicated baths." The building was expanded three times in 12 years and by the early 1920s the sanitarium had grown to a three-story building.

In 1925, a group of local physicians opened a rival hospital. Built at the cost of $200,000, it contained the latest in medical equipment and facilities. However, the Great Depression caused the rival hospital to go bankrupt and it was auctioned in a sheriff's sale in 1931, and was purchased by the Walla Walla Sanitarium for $75,000.

The 1940s saw a boom in census after the lean years of the Great Depression. In the hospital's 1943 annual report, the manager stated that bed capacity was 53, with an average of 49.6 patients per day.  In 1950, the community was challenged to raise one-third of the proposed $385,000 needed for expansion. A new west wing was added in 1956, and in the 1960s, the hospital was remodeled and technologically updated.

In the early 1970s, another renovation was necessary. The needs of the institution, now known as Walla Walla General Hospital (WWGH), were presented to the community and they pledged one-third of the needed $750,000. The hospital board also decided to relocate entirely than build onto the original building. During the process, WWGH joined Adventist Health on December 9, 1973.  On September 18, 1975, groundbreaking ceremonies were held at WWGH's current location. Two years later, on July 10, 1977, the grand opening of the new facility was held.

In June 2001 a surprise FDA inspection found problems with the technical controls in the hospital's autologous blood bank and further problems were found in December 2002, but a followup in April 2003 verified that all the problems had been corrected.

Walla Walla General Hospital closed on July 24, 2017 it was part of Adventist Health.

In the news
Jan. 26 2007—Portland Business Journal--"Knittel appointed leader of Walla Walla General Hospital" 

May 1, 2004—Inspection Monitor--"Adventist Health Walla Walla General Hospital shows complete recovery"

Feb. 6 1967—Ellensburg Daily Record--"Adventists in Northwest since 1862"

See also

References

External links
Adventist Health

Hospitals in Washington (state)
Adventist Health
Buildings and structures in Walla Walla County, Washington
Hospitals established in 1899
Hospital buildings completed in 1903
Former Seventh-day Adventist institutions